Diederik Alexander Stapel (born 19 October 1966) is a Dutch former professor of social psychology at Tilburg University. In 2011 Tilburg University suspended Stapel for fabricating and manipulating data for his research publications. This scientific misconduct took place over a number of years and affected dozens of his publications. , Stapel has had 58 of these publications retracted and is regarded by some as "the biggest con man in academic science".

Early life
Stapel was born to Rob Stapel and Dirkje Stapel on 19 October 1966 in the village of Oegstgeest, near Leiden.

In high school, he met his future wife Marcelle; they married in 1997. After completing his schooling, Stapel, for a while, studied acting at East Stroudsburg University in Pennsylvania before moving back to the Netherlands for an undergraduate degree in Psychology.

Career
Stapel obtained an M.A. in psychology and communications in 1991 and a PhD cum laude in social psychology in 1997, all from the University of Amsterdam. He became a professor at the University of Groningen in 2000 and moved to Tilburg University in 2006, where he founded TiBER, the Tilburg Institute for Behavioral Economics Research. In September 2010, Stapel became dean of the social and behavioral sciences faculty.

Stapel received the Career Trajectory Award from the Society of Experimental Social Psychology in 2009, which has since been retracted. He returned his PhD title to the University of Amsterdam in November 2011, noting that his "behavior of the past years are inconsistent with the duties associated with the doctorate".

In October 2014, Dutch media reporter, Eli MacColl, stated that Stapel had returned to work, teaching social philosophy at the Fontys Academy for Creative Industries in Tilburg.

Scientific misconduct 
In September 2011, Tilburg University suspended Stapel due to his fabrication of data used in research publications. The university announced an investigation of his work.

Levelt committee
On 31 October 2011, a committee entrusted with investigating "the extent and nature of the breach of scientific integrity committed by Mr D.A. Stapel", formed by the Rector Magnificus of Tilburg University and chaired by Willem ("Pim") Levelt, published an interim report regarding Stapel's activities at the three Dutch universities where he had worked. The interim report pointed to three unidentified young researchers as the whistleblowers for the case, and implies that these whistleblowers spent months making observations of Stapel and his work before they concluded that something actually was wrong.

The report also cites two professors who claim they had previously seen examples of Stapel's data that were "too good to be true." The report concluded that Stapel made up data for at least 30 publications.

His general method towards the end of his career was to develop a complete experiment at the level of theory, hypotheses, methods, stimuli, questionnaires, and even participants' rewards – and then pretend that he would run the experiments at schools to which only he had access. Instead of doing so, he would make up the data and send these to colleagues for further analysis. The report also stated that earlier in his career, going back at least to 2004, he appears to have manipulated data rather than faked them.

In all cases he acted alone and the report did not find any indication that coauthors, PhD students, or others were aware even in instances where suspicion may have been reasonable. On pages six to seven, the interim report names 19 theses prepared with data delivered by Stapel. Of those, seven have been cleared. There are various degrees of suspicion about the remaining 12. The report advised that the degrees of the students involved should not be retracted.

It became widely known that Stapel treated his graduate students unfairly, with most of them graduating without ever actually completing an experiment. 
Stapel controlled the data in his lab, and when students asked to see the raw data, they were often given excuses.

According to the report, there were occasions when Stapel's data were given to an assistant to be entered into a computer. This assistant would then return the data file to Stapel. The researcher analyzing the data would then receive the file directly from Stapel. Stapel would apparently tell this researcher to "Be aware that you have gold in your hands." The report also suggests that Stapel elected to present a list of publications that contained fictitious data.

The interim report stated that it was not possible to determine whether Stapel fabricated or manipulated data for his 1997 dissertation at the University of Amsterdam, because the data had been destroyed. The university announced that it would investigate whether it would be possible to retract Stapel's PhD because of exceptionally unworthy scientific behavior.

The interim report stated that Stapel had caused severe damage to young people at the beginning of their careers, as well as to the general confidence in science, in particular social psychology. The University of Tilburg announced that it would pursue criminal prosecution of Stapel.

An extensive report investigates all of Stapel's 130 articles and 24 book chapters. A website was set up on 27 March 2012 to publish intermediate findings. According to the first findings, on the first batch of 20 publications by Stapel, studied by the Levelt committee, 12 were falsified and three contributions to books were also fraudulent. de Volkskrant reported that the final report was due on 28 November 2012, and that a book by Stapel was to be released around the same time.

"We have some 30 papers in peer-reviewed journals where we are actually sure that they are fake, and there are more to come," Pim Levelt, chair of the committee investigating Stapel's work stated.

Coping with chaos
A month after Tilburg University announced that it had found evidence of fraud in Stapel's work, the journal Science posted a retraction notice on Stapel's co-authored paper entitled Coping with chaos: How disordered contexts promote stereotyping and discrimination. The report from Science says:

In December 2011, Stapel retracted this paper, the first to be retracted. The journal expressed initial concern regarding the paper's validity on 1 November. In a response to the retraction, coauthor of the Chaos paper Siegwart Lindenberg told the journal in an email, "Stapel's doing had caught me as much by surprise as it did anybody else. I never had any suspicion. He was a very trusted man, dean of the faculty, brilliant, successful, no indications for me to be distrustful. In this, I was not the only one. I also had no trouble with the results of the experiments."

Selfishness in carnivores
The research result, obtained by Stapel and co-workers Roos Vonk and Marcel Zeelenberg, that carnivores are more selfish than vegetarians, which was widely publicized in Dutch media, was suspected and later turned out to be based on falsified data. The research result had not yet been published in a scientific journal; only a press bulletin was released.

Reaction by Stapel
Responding to the interim report, Stapel stated:

In his memoirs published in November 2012, Stapel admits his fraud, but protests against the accusation in the interim report that he was a cunning, manipulative fraud with a plan.

Reaction in academia
On 28 November 2012, the joint final report, from the three investigating committees, was published.

It has been suggested that Stapel was able to continue his fraud for so long because of his status. At Tilburg he was "considered a star" and was seen by his colleagues and students as charismatic, friendly and incredibly talented. Many students became his personal friends. But the final Levelt report raises more controversial questions about the ways in which Stapel went unchallenged for so long. The report concludes that there was "a more general failure of scientific criticism in the peer community and a research culture that was excessively oriented to uncritical confirmation of one's own ideas and to finding appealing but theoretically superficial ad hoc results". It goes on to suggest that "not infrequently reviews [of social psychology journal articles] were strongly in favour of telling an interesting, elegant, concise and compelling story, possibly at the expense of the necessary scientific diligence."

This aspect of the report has been criticised by the Social Psychology Section of the British Psychological Society. In a letter to the Times Higher Education Supplement, on behalf of the Section, Stephen Gibson at York St John University, points out ".. there are no grounds for concluding either that research fraud is any more common in social psychology than other disciplines or that its editorial processes are particularly poor at detecting it," adding that: "Our sub-discipline does not deserve the harm to its reputation that may be provoked by the careless implication of unique deficiencies." The Levelt report has also been criticised by the European Association of Social Psychology in an open letter to its members.

In the February 2013 issue of The Psychologist, Willem Levelt, together with the chairs of the other two investigating committees, published a rejoinder to these and other criticisms. Drenth et al. acknowledge that they did not compare the situation in social psychology with other disciplines, but note that "such a comparative investigation was not part of the Committees' commission."

In a review for the Association for Psychological Science, Stapel's 315-page memoirs, entitled Ontsporing ("Derailed"), is described by Dutch psychologists Denny Borsboom and Eric-Jan Wagenmakers as "priceless and revealing." Stapel recounts that his misdemeanours began when he was sitting alone in his office and changed "an unexpected 2 into a 4". The reviewers describe the final chapter of the book as "unexpectedly beautiful" but note that it is full of lines taken from the works of writers Raymond Carver and James Joyce.

Prosecution settlement
In June 2013 Stapel agreed, in a settlement with the prosecutor, to perform 120 hours of community service and to lose the right to some benefits associated with his former job equivalent to a year and a half's worth of salary. In this way, he avoided further criminal prosecution.

List of withdrawn publications
As of December, 2015, Retraction Watch reported that Stapel had 58 retractions.
These include the following:

Selected scientific publications
 
 
 This paper is one of three retracted by the journal.
 
 
 
 
 According to the Trouw newspaper, this article is based on faked data.
The article was retracted by the journal following an Expression of Concern.

Other publications
Stapel, Diederik; Ontsporing ("Derailment"); Prometheus Books, November 2012; 
English translation as a free download in PDF format
A.H.J. Dautzenberg & Diederik Stapel; De fictiefabriek. Een bevrijdingsroman in brieven ("The Fiction Factory. A Liberating Epistolary Novel"); Atlas Contact, September 2014;

See also 
 List of scientific misconduct incidents
 Schön scandal
 Jonathan Pruitt

References

Footnotes

Bibliography 
 Flawed Science. The fraudulent research practices of social psychologist Diederik Stapel. (Final Report of the Stapel Committees, November 2012) 
 Frank van Kolfschooten; Ontspoorde wetenschap ("Derailed Science"); De Kring publishers; October 2012;

External links 
 
 

1966 births
Academic scandals
Dutch social psychologists
Living people
People from Oegstgeest
People involved in scientific misconduct incidents
Academic staff of Tilburg University
University of Amsterdam alumni
Academic staff of the University of Groningen